The McMahon family is an Irish-American family, primarily known for their involvement in the professional wrestling business. They are the founders, owners, and promoters of the wrestling company, WWE. Vince McMahon, a third generation wrestling promoter, was the chairman and CEO of the company. McMahon joined his father's regional wrestling company in 1969 and purchased the promotion 13 years later. WWF (now called WWE) went public in 1999 and today its programs are broadcasting in around 150 countries and more than 30 languages. The company has also branched out into movie production and - separate to WWE - American football, with two incarnations of the XFL.

History 
The family’s involvement in wrestling started when Jess McMahon, who was descended from the Thomond McMahon clan of Western Ireland, began promoting wrestling shows in 1915. He died in 1954. Jess and his son, Vincent J. McMahon, formed the Capitol Wrestling Corporation in 1953, which would subsequently be renamed twice during his tenure (as the World Wide Wrestling Federation, and then the World Wrestling Federation). Vince Sr. had two wives, Victoria Askew and Juanita Johnston. When he retired in 1982, his son from his first marriage, Vince McMahon, purchased the business and served as Chairman and Chief Executive Officer of the company until July 2022, at which time he retired as a result of a sex scandal. The company is now known as World Wrestling Entertainment, Inc. (WWE) since 2002 and Alpha Entertainment, LLC since 2017.

Vince and Linda's children are Shane and Stephanie. Shane is married to Marissa Mazzola, and Stephanie is married to Paul Levesque, best known by his wrestling moniker Triple H. Stephanie and Paul have three daughters named Aurora Rose, Murphy Claire, and Vaughn Evelyn. Shane and Marissa have three sons, Declan James, Kenyon Jesse, and Rogan Henry. Linda would step down as CEO to run for United States Senate in Connecticut. Their son, Shane also eventually departed WWE at the beginning of 2010 to become Chairman and Principal executive officer of YOU On Demand Inc., a New York City based company with its primary business in China, but he would later return to the WWE in 2016 as an on-screen talent. Vince, Stephanie, and Shane are the only three members born into the McMahon family working under the brand as of 2021. Although every member holds a collective 90% of WWE stock through WWE's Class B shares, which the family controls completely. As of June 2016, the WWE has a U.S. dollar market cap that is over $1.38 billion.

In December 2016, Linda was nominated to be the Administrator of the Small Business Administration by President Donald Trump, and served from 2017 through 2019.

Family tree 

=

McMahon job titles 
 Vince McMahon – Chairman of WWE
 Linda McMahon – Chair of America First Policies, Former SBA Administrator, former CEO of WWE
 Stephanie McMahon – Former Chairwoman and Former co-CEO of WWE, former Chief Brand Officer of WWE
 Shane McMahon – Executive Vice Chairman of the Board of Directors of Ideanomics; Minority owner of WWE

See also 
 List of family relations in professional wrestling

References 

 
American families of Irish ancestry
Business families of the United States
Professional wrestling families
WWE
WWE executives
History of WWE
XFL (2001)
XFL (2020) owners